Bonded neo powder is produced by processing specific combination of elements that result in distinct magnetic and physical characteristics. These powders are the primary material used in the manufacture of bonded rare earth permanent magnets, which, in turn, are used in motors and sensors utilized in a wide variety of products for consumer and industrial end markets. Neodymium metal, one of the rare earth elements, is the primary raw material in neo powder. It is alloyed with iron and boron, occasionally along with other elements in small quantities (such as cobalt). The alloy is melted and then rapidly solidified by melt spinning to produce neo powders with the desired characteristics for the manufacture of bonded neo magnets.

Bonded neo magnets were first invented in 1982, and since that time they have been refined to a point where they now possess the highest magnetic strength of the four types of permanent magnets.

Applications of bonded neo powder
Bonded neo powder is incorporated into numerous end market applications that utilize bonded neo magnets. These products are primarily motors and sensors used in a range of products, including computer and office equipment (e.g., hard disk drives and optical disk drive motors and fax, copier and printer stepper motors), consumer electronics (e.g., personal video recorders and mp3 music players), automotive and industrial applications (e.g., instrument panel motors, seat motors and air bag sensors) and home ventilation systems (e.g., ceiling fans).

Type of bonded neo powders
MQP products are isotropic magnetic powders that are used in the manufacture of bonded magnets.  No alignment field is necessary during the magnet manufacturing process for MQP-based magnets.
MQP powder properties range:
Br = 730 mT - 1000mT (7.30kG -10.00kG)
(BH)max = 97kJ/m3 - 140kJ/m3 (12.2MGOe to 17.6 MGOe)
Hci = 525kA/m - 1350kA/m (6.5kOe - 17.0kOe)
MQA are anisotropic magnetic powders that are used in the manufacture of bonded magnets. An alignment field is necessary during the magnet manufacturing process to provide the anisotropy that yields higher magnetic properties.
MQFP technology, applicable to all MQP grades, reduces the mean powder particle size from 160 to 5 micrometres.
MQU are the highest-performing isotropic powders to be used in the production of MQ2-type magnets, which are fully dense isotropic magnets.

Production 
Nd-Fe-B powder is bound in a matrix of a thermoplastic polymer to form the magnets. 

The magnetic alloy material is formed by splat quenching onto a water-cooled drum. This metal ribbon is crushed to a powder and then heat-treated to improve its coercivity. The powder is mixed with a polymer to form a mouldable putty, similar to a glass-filled polymer. This is pelletised for storage and can later be shaped by injection moulding. An external magnetic field is applied during the moulding process, orienting the field of the completed magnet.

References

Further information
 Bonded neo powder

Types of magnets
Magnetic alloys